Rudi Khola-B Hydropower Station (Nepali: रुदी खोला जलविद्युत आयोजना) is a run-of-river hydro-electric plant located in   Kaski District of Nepal. The flow from Rudi River is used to generate 6.6 MW electricity. The design head is 299.81 m and flow is 2.55 m3/s at Q40%

The plant is owned and developed by Bindhyabasini Hydropower Development Co. Pvt Ltd, an IPP of Nepal. The plant started generating electricity from 2076-11-05BS. The generation licence will expire in 2109-02-25 BS, after which the plant will be handed over to the government.  The power station is connected to the national grid and the electricity is sold to Nepal Electricity Authority.

See also

List of power stations in Nepal

References

External links
Salient features of the project

Hydroelectric power stations in Nepal
Gravity dams
Run-of-the-river power stations
Dams in Nepal
Irrigation in Nepal
Buildings and structures in Kaski District